Palacio Salvo is a building in Montevideo, Uruguay, located at the intersection of 18 de Julio Avenue and Plaza Independencia. It was designed by the architect Mario Palanti, an Italian immigrant living in Buenos Aires, who used a similar design for his Palacio Barolo in Buenos Aires, Argentina. It was the tallest building in Latin America for a brief period.

Overview 
The site was bought by the Salvo brothers for 650,000 Uruguayan pesos. It was built on the site where the Confiteria La Giralda was once located, a place renowned for being where Gerardo Matos Rodríguez wrote his tango La Cumparsita in 1917. At present, on that same historic site, inside Palacio Salvo, the Tango Museum of Montevideo is open to the public, and exhibits the history of La Cumparsita and of Uruguayan Tango.

The original specifications, describing the details of the construction, describe a lighthouse at the top of the building, which was replaced by a set of antennas.

The building was originally intended to be a hotel, but this plan didn't work out, and it has since been occupied by a mixture of offices and private residences. The antennas were permanently removed in November 2012.

Trivia 
 The song "The Tower of Montevideo", included in Damon Albarn's 2021 album The Nearer the Fountain, More Pure the Stream Flows, is inspired by this building.

See also
Palacio Barolo
List of tallest buildings in Uruguay

References

External links

Official website

Buildings and structures completed in 1925
Palaces in Montevideo
Art Nouveau architecture in Uruguay
Art Nouveau commercial buildings
Art Nouveau apartment buildings